Sérgio Waismann (born August 7, 1955) is a former international butterfly swimmer from Brazil, who competed at one Summer Olympics for his native country.

At the 1972 Summer Olympics, in Munich, he finished 5th in the 4×100-metre medley (improving in 5 seconds the South American record), along with Rômulo Arantes, José Fiolo and José Aranha. He also swam the 100-metre butterfly, not reaching the finals. 

Participated at the inaugural World Aquatics Championships in 1973 Belgrade, in the 200-metre butterfly race.

References

1955 births
Living people
Brazilian male butterfly swimmers
Swimmers at the 1972 Summer Olympics
Olympic swimmers of Brazil
20th-century Brazilian people